Kariong is a locality of the Central Coast region of New South Wales, Australia west of Gosford along the Central Coast Highway.  It is part of the  local government area.

History
Kariong's first British settler was W.H. Parry in 1901. The Mt Penang Training School for Boys (later the Mount Penang Juvenile Justice Centre) was opened in 1911. Many of the boys came from the training ship Sobraon, which had been in Sydney Harbour before being condemned, as did former officer Basil Topple. The village of about fifteen families, mostly workers at the training school, was first called Kendall Heights, then Penang Mountain. The name Kariong was assigned in about 1947.

Kariong Mountains High School opened in 2010 at Kariong.

Etymology
Kariong was once believed to mean meeting place in the local Aboriginal language, and that is how it is described by the Geographical Names Board.

Geography
Kariong's boundaries include a considerable section of the Brisbane Water National Park to the south, and the Mount Penang Parklands, with its native gardens. Kariong is considered the entry point to the Central Coast as it borders the Pacific Motorway M1. A visitor information centre for the Central Coast is located just off the Central Coast Highway, near the entry to the Mount Penang Parklands.

Population
According to the 2016 census of Population, there were 6,385 people in Kariong.
 Aboriginal and Torres Strait Islander people made up 3.6% of the population. 
 77.7% of people were born in Australia. The next most common countries of birth were England 5.0% and New Zealand 2.3%.   
 86.0% of people spoke only English at home. 
 The most common responses for religion were No Religion 30.6%, Catholic 21.2% and Anglican 20.3%.

Culture

The NAISDA Dance College, a performing arts training college for Aboriginal and Torres Strait Islander people from all over Australia,  is based in the Mount Penang Parklands in Kariong.

Gosford glyphs

The Gosford Glyphs, which are a group of approximately 300 carvings which appear similar to Egyptian hieroglyphs carved into two parallel sandstone, are located in the area. They were first reported in 1975 by Alan Dash, a local surveyor who had been visiting the area for seven years. These are now generally dismissed as a hoax.

References

External links
 Kariong Mountains High School

Suburbs of the Central Coast (New South Wales)